Traffic Cops is a British documentary series broadcast on Channel 5 (and formerly on BBC One) which follows Roads Policing Units from various UK police forces. It has consistently been one of the most watched factual series on UK television.

Concept
The show follows the day-to-day role of a traffic officer and the incidents they come across. The majority of filming takes place at the scene of incidents, with occasional cuts to police stations and interview rooms. Locations include Derbyshire, Yorkshire, Hampshire, Humberside, South Wales, Sussex, Bedfordshire, and Hertfordshire.

The current series follows Officers from the Roads Policing Group and Road Crime Team from North Yorkshire Police. Previous series have followed Derbyshire Constabulary, South Yorkshire Police, Hampshire Constabulary, Humberside Police, South Wales Police, Sussex Police, Bedfordshire Police, Hertfordshire Constabulary and West Yorkshire Police.

The show is currently airing on Channel 5, branded simply as Traffic Cops, having been previously branded (since moving to Channel 5) as Traffic Cops, All New Traffic Cops, Traffic Cops: Under Attack and Traffic Cops: On The Edge. It remains following the Roads Policing Unit, and the Operational Support Units. It also follows some promoted officers in their role on district as they continue policing the roads.

Production 
Traffic Cops, along with its sister series Motorway Cops, are produced by Folio Productions, a subsidiary of Mentorn Media. Both shows were broadcast on the BBC until 2016. Between 2003 and 2015, Jamie Theakston narrated the programme. On 28 June 2016, Mentorn Media announced that the show had been recommissioned by Channel 5, and would mark a return of Theakston with an "expanded on-screen role".

Episodes

Series overview

Series 1 (2003)

Series 2 (2004)

Series 3 (2005)

Series 4 (2006)

Series 5 (2007)

Series 6 (2008)

Series 7 (2009)

Series 8 (2010)

Series 9 (2011)

Series 10 (2012)

Series 11 (2014)

Series 12 (2015)

Series 13 (2015)

Series 14 (2016)

All New Traffic Cops, Series 15 (2016–17)
The show was renamed All New Traffic Cops for this series.

All New Traffic Cops, Series 16 (2017)
The first six episodes were subtitled Under Attack

Traffic Cops: On The Edge 2018, Series 17 (2018)
This series is subtitled On The Edge

Series 18 (2018–19)

Series 19 (2019–20)

Series 20 (2020)

Series 21 (2021)

Series 22 (2021–22)

Series 23 (2022)

Series 24 (2023)

See also
 Motorway Cops – sister series broadcast on BBC One.
 Sky Cops – sister series broadcast on BBC One.
 Police Interceptors – series broadcast on Channel 5 with a similar format.
 Brit Cops – police documentary series originally on Bravo and now on Sky Livingit.
 Road Wars – programme broadcast on Sky1, Sky2, and Pick TV which is about Road Traffic Police.
 Street Wars – programme broadcast on Sky about police officers "on the beat".
 Police Camera Action! – series broadcast on ITV with a similar format.

References

External links 

2003 British television series debuts
2000s British crime television series
2010s British crime television series
2020s British crime television series
2000s British reality television series
2010s British reality television series
2020s British reality television series
BBC television documentaries
Channel 5 (British TV channel) original programming
Documentary television series about policing
Television shows set in the United Kingdom